Costumer may refer to:

 one that deals in or makes costumes
 a costume designer
 an upright stand with hooks or pegs on which to hang clothes

See also
 Customer